Roberto Neves Filho (born 6 February 1965) is a Brazilian wrestler. He competed at the 1988 Summer Olympics and the 1992 Summer Olympics. He managed the American soccer team Atlanta SC from 2018 to 2019.

References

1965 births
Living people
Brazilian male sport wrestlers
Olympic wrestlers of Brazil
Wrestlers at the 1988 Summer Olympics
Wrestlers at the 1992 Summer Olympics
Sportspeople from Rio de Janeiro (city)
Pan American Games medalists in wrestling
Pan American Games silver medalists for Brazil
Wrestlers at the 1987 Pan American Games
20th-century Brazilian people
21st-century Brazilian people